This article contains information about the literary events and publications of 1855.

Events
January – Samuel Orchart Beeton's weekly The Boys' Own Magazine, "an illustrated journal of fact, fiction, history and adventure", begins publication in London.
January 5 – Anthony Trollope's novel The Warden, the first of his Chronicles of Barsetshire, is published in London by Longman as he begins to write the second, Barchester Towers.
February 25 – The comedy De Scholtschäin, by Edmond de la Fontaine writing as Dicks, becomes the first play to be performed in the language of Luxembourg.
June 29 – The Daily Telegraph newspaper begins publication in London.
July 4 – Walt Whitman's first edition of his book of poems titled Leaves of Grass is published in Brooklyn, New York.
September 27 – Alfred Tennyson reads from his new book Maud and other poems at a social gathering in the home of Robert and Elizabeth Browning in London. Dante Gabriel Rossetti makes a sketch of him doing so.
October – Victor Hugo moves to Hauteville House, Saint Peter Port, Guernsey, in the Channel Islands, accompanied by his mistress, Juliette Drouet.
December
Charles Dickens publishes the first instalment of Little Dorrit, which continues to appear into 1857.
Thomas Babington Macaulay's best-selling History of England in four volumes is completed.
unknown dates
Alexander Afanasyev begins publication of his collection of Narodnye russkie skazki [National Russian Tales].
John Camden Hotten opens a bookselling business in London, which is the origin of the publisher Chatto & Windus.
Faris al-Shidyaq publishes the metafiction Sâq 'ala al-sâq (Leg over Leg), the first modern Arabic novel, in Paris.
The first Luxembourg novel in French, Marc Bruno, profil d'artiste, is published shortly after the death of its author, Félix Thyes (born 1830). 
Belarusian writer Vintsent Dunin-Martsinkyevich publishes «Гапон» (Hapon) in the Russian Empire, the first poem written wholly in modern Belarusian.

New books

Fiction
Gheorghe Asachi – Ziua din urmă a municipiului Iașenilor (The Last Day of Iași Municipality)
Cuthbert Bede (pseudonym) – The Adventures of Mr. Verdant Green (other volumes, 1856 and 1857)
Gustav Freytag – Debit and Credit (Soll und Haben)
Elizabeth Gaskell – North and South
James Grant – The Yellow Frigate (also entitled The Three Sisters)
Mary Virginia Hawes – The Hidden Path
Caroline Lee Hentz – Robert Graham
Paul Heyse – "L'Arrabbiata" (The Fury, short story)
Washington Irving – Wolfert's Roost
Gottfried Keller – Green Henry (Der grüne Heinrich)
Charles Kingsley – Westward Ho!
Herman Melville
Israel Potter
The Paradise of Bachelors and the Tartarus of Maids
Benito Cereno
Gérard de Nerval – Aurelia
Giovanni Ruffini – Doctor Antonio
Ann Sophia Stephens – The Old Homestead
William Makepeace Thackeray – The Newcomes
Félix Thyes – Marc Bruno, profil d'artiste
Anthony Trollope – The Warden (first in the Chronicles of Barchester series of six books)

Children
Božena Němcová – The Grandmother

Drama
Émile Augier – Le Mariage d'Olympe
Dicks
De Scholtschäin
D'Mumm Sèiss
Léon Gozlan – Le Gâteau des reines
Henrik Ibsen – The Feast at Solhaug
Andreas Munch – En Aften paa Giske
Watts Phillips – Joseph Chavigny
Ivan Turgenev – A Month in the Country

Poetry
Henry Wadsworth Longfellow – The Song of Hiawatha
Walt Whitman – Leaves of Grass

Non-fiction
David Brewster – Memoirs of the Life, Writings and Discoveries of Sir Isaac Newton
John Brown – Slave Life in Georgia
Washington Irving – The Life of George Washington, Volumes 1 and 2
George Sand – Histoire de ma vie (The Story of My Life)
William Smith – Latin–English Dictionary based upon the works of Forcellini and Freund
Leo Tolstoy – Sevastopol Sketches (Севастопольские рассказы, Sevastopolskiye rasskazy)
Alfred Russel Wallace – On the Law Which has Regulated the Introduction of Species

Births
February 21 – Elizabeth Robins Pennell, American biographer and critic based in London (died 1936)
April 4 – Manonmaniam Sundaram Pillai, Indian dramatist (died 1897)
April 27 – Margaret Wolfe Hungerford, Irish novelist (died 1897)
May 1 – Marie Corelli (Mary Mackay), English novelist (died 1924)
May 21 – Emile Verhaeren, Belgian Symbolist poet writing in French (died 1916)
May 24 – Sir Arthur Wing Pinero, English dramatist (died 1934)
July 7 – Ludwig Ganghofer, German novelist (died 1920)
July 19 – Alexander Ertel, Russian novelist and short story writer (died 1908)
August 7 – Stanley J. Weyman, English novelist (died 1928)
September 12 – William Sharp, Scottish poet and biographer (died 1905)
September 22 – Alice Zimmern, English writer, translator and suffragist (died 1939)
October 26 – Jessie Wilson Manning, American author and lecturer (died 1947)
October 30 – Pyotr Gnedich, Russian writer and poet (died 1925)
November 4 – William Ritchie Sorley, Scottish philosopher (died 1935)
December 15 – Maurice Bouchor, French poet and sculptor (died 1929)
December 28 – Juan Zorrilla de San Martín, Uruguayan poet (died 1931)
unknown date
Solomon Cleaver, Canadian story teller, novelist and pastor (died 1939)
Florence Huntley, American journalist, editor, humorist, and occult author (died 1912)

Deaths
January 3 – János Majláth, Hungarian poet and historian (born 1786)
January 10 – Mary Russell Mitford, English dramatist and novelist (born 1787)
January 25 – Dorothy Wordsworth, English poet and diarist (born 1771)
January 26 – Gérard de Nerval (Gérard Labrunie), French poet and essayist (suicide, born 1808)
February 4 – Gottfried Christian Friedrich Lücke, German theologian (born 1791)
March 31 – Charlotte Brontë, English novelist and poet (born 1816)
June 29 – Delphine de Girardin, French poet and novelist (born 1804)
July 12 – Karl Spindler, German novelist, (born 1796)
September 4 – Emma Tatham, English poet (born 1829)
September 27 – John Adamson, English antiquary and scholar of Portuguese (born 1787)
November 11 – Søren Kierkegaard, Danish philosopher (born 1813)
November 19 – Mihály Vörösmarty, Hungarian poet and dramatist (born 1800)
November 26 – Adam Mickiewicz, Poland's national poet (cholera, born 1798)
December 3 – Robert Montgomery, English poet (born 1807)
unknown date – Sunthorn Phu, Thai poet (born 1786)

References

 
Years of the 19th century in literature